Arti Hilpus (born 31 October 1972 in Elva) is an Estonian diplomat.

He has graduated from the University of Tartu, and Geneva Centre for Security Policy.

2006–2008, he was the Director of the Foreign Ministry's Security Policy Division.

Diplomatic posts:
 2001–2004 Ambassador to Germany
 2009–2012 Ambassador to Norway and Iceland
 2012–2015 Ambassador to Bosnia and Herzegovina, Macedonia, Montenegro and Serbia
 2015–2018 Ambassador of Estonia to Russian Federation

References

Living people
1972 births
Estonian diplomats
Ambassadors of Estonia to Germany
Ambassadors of Estonia to Norway
Ambassadors of Estonia to Iceland
Ambassadors of Estonia to Bosnia and Herzegovina
Ambassadors of Estonia to North Macedonia
Ambassadors of Estonia to Montenegro
Ambassadors of Estonia to Serbia
Ambassadors of Estonia to Russia
University of Tartu alumni
People from Elva, Estonia